Jainism has been present in Maharashtra since ancient times. The famous Ellora Caves demonstrate that Jainism was part of a thriving religious culture in Maharashtra in premodern times.

History

Jainism in Maharashtra has a long history.
The oldest inscription in Maharashtra is a 2nd-century BC Jain inscription in a cave near Pale village in the Pune District. It was written in the Jain Prakrit and includes the Navkar Mantra.
The first Marathi inscription known is at Shravanabelagola, Karnataka near the left foot of the statue of Bahubali, dated 981 CE.

Maharashtra was ruled many Jain rulers such as the Rashtrakuta dynasty and the Shilaharas. Many of forts were built by kings from these dynasties and thus Jain temples or their remains are found in them. Texts such as the Shankardigvijaya and Shivlilamruta suggest that a large number of Marathi people followed jainism in the ancient period.

Jain communities in present day Maharashtra

There are many native jain communities in present day Maharashtra. The communities tend to be endogamous, and generally do not intermarry with the Jains who have arrived from North India.They belong to the Digambar sect.The four largest communities by numbers are:

 Saitwal, originally Tailors and Cloth Merchants
 Chaturtha, originally agriculturists, now engaged in various professions
 Panchama, various professions
  Kasar, traditionally coppersmiths
Each of the above communities are affiliated to their own Matha and led by the Matha leader called Bhattaraka.
In addition to the above four, there are several smaller native Maharashtrian Jain communities.

 Upajjhaya
 Kamboja
 Harada
Jabade, Jain community in Maharashtra
 Dhakad A small Jain community found primarily in Western Vidarbha districts of Akola, Yavatmal, Washim and Amravati.

Jains from other regions have a large population in Maharashtra. Majority of them are from Rajasthan and Gujarat. Some of them are from Madhya Pradesh and Uttar Pradesh. Some of these communities have been in Maharashtra for centuries, and are now indistinguishable from the native residents of Maharashtra. They are divided in following large groups:
 Agrawal
 Oswal
 Sarawagi
 Jaiswal
 Shrimali
 Humad
 Bagherwal
 Palliwal
 Porwad
 Ban 
Parmar

Religious organizations

The Dakshin Bharat Jain Sabha is a religious and social service organization of the Jains of South India. The organization is headquartered at Kolhapur, Maharashtra, India. The association is credited with being one of the first Jain associations to start reform movements among the Jains in modern India. The organization mainly seeks to represent the interests of the native Jains of Maharashtra (Marathi Jains) and Karnataka (Kannada Jains).

Jainism in Mumbai

Mumbai has one of the largest populations of Jains amongst all the cities in India. Mumbai also has numerous Jain temples.

Jain Tirthas and Temples

 Cave temple
 Ellora Jain Caves
 Nasik Caves
 Manmodi Caves
 Mangi-Tungi

 Main temple
 Shantinath Jain Teerth
 Gajpanth
 Kumbhoj
 Shantinath Jain Teerth
 Shantinath temple, Ramtek
 Jahaj Mandir, Mandwala
 Jintur
 Godiji Parshwanath Temple, Mumbai
 Nemgiri in Parbhani district
 Katraj Tirth
 Babu Amichand Panalal Adishwarji Jain Temple, Walkeshwar
 Shri Antariksha Parshvanath
 Shree Vimalnath Bhagwan Tirth, Sakri
 Shirpurji teerth, Dhule district, Nashik
 Pashvanath Jain Temple, Nijampur Dhule
 Shri 1008 Mallinath Digamber Jain Atishaya Kshetra, Shirad Shahpur
 Shri vimalnatha swami Jain shwetambar temple in Bibwewadi
 Kachner Jain temple in Aurangabad, Maharashtra
 Paithan Jain Tirth
 Trimurti Digambar Jain Mandir in Sanjay Gandhi National Park, Borivali
 Shree Mahavir Jain Temple in Pimpri-Chinchwad near Pune
 Shri Digamber Jain Siddha Kshetra Kunthalgiri, Dist. Osmanabad, Maharashtra

Gallery

Notable Marathi Jains
 Walchand Hirachand
 Ajit Gulabchand
 Akshar Kothari
 V. Shantaram
 Sandhya Shantaram
 Kiran Shantaram
 Karmaveer Bhaurao Patil
 Bal Patil
 Suresh Jain
 Vaibhav Mangle
 Raju Shetti
 Vidyadhar Johrapurkar
 Nirmalkumar Phadkule
 Vilas Adinath Sangave
 Dhulappa Bhaurao Navale
 Kallapa Awade
Rajendra Patil
Justice Bhalchandra Vagyani
Dhananjay Gunde

See also

 Jainism in Mumbai
 Acharya Shantisagar
 Acharya Vidyasagar

References

External links
JainConnect.org - Newly evolving Online Portal/Directory for Jain Community
 A portal to connect jains and discuss about Jainism and other things
  Jain Tirthas in Maharashtra
 Ellora
 History Of Maharashtra

Jain communities
Jainism in India
History of Maharashtra